A Berkovich tip is a type of nanoindenter tip used for testing the indentation hardness of a material. It is a three-sided pyramid which is geometrically self-similar. The popular Berkovich now has a very flat profile, with a total included angle of 142.3 degrees and a half angle of 65.27 degrees, measured from the axis to one of the pyramid flats. This Berkovich tip has the same projected area-to-depth ratio as a Vickers indenter.  The original tip shape was invented by Russian scientist E.S. Berkovich in the USSR c. 1950, which has a half angle of 65.03 degrees.

As it is three sided, it is easier to grind these tips to a sharp point and so is more readily employed for nanoindentation tests.

References 

Hardness tests
Soviet inventions
Russian inventions